Križna Gora is a dispersed settlement in the hills north of Col in the Municipality of Ajdovščina in the Littoral region of Slovenia.

References

External links 
Križna Gora at Geopedia

Populated places in the Municipality of Ajdovščina